Palaikastro or Palekastro (officially ), with the Godart and Olivier abbreviation PK, is a thriving town, geographic heir to a long line of settlements extending back into prehistoric times, at the east end of the Mediterranean island Crete. The Kallikratis Programme implemented starting 2011 made the town into a local community (topiki koinoteta) under jurisdiction of the next-highest levels, chained as follows: municipal unit (demotike enoteta) Itanos, municipality (demos) Sitia, regional unit (periphereiakes enotetas) Lasithi, region (periphereia) Crete.

Until 2017 Palaikastro shared Itanos with Karydi, Zakros, and Mitato (Μητάτο). The latter was located on an altiplano to the west. It had 6 villages, including Mitato ("hut"), named after an ancient stone shepherd's mitato of interest to visitors. However, subsequently the population on the plain diminished to the point where Mitato village had no permanent residents. Consequently by Presidential Decree No. 70/207, on recommendation of the Minister of the Interior, and approval by Sitia and Palaikastro, K. Mitato was phased out and its settlements were turned over to Palaikastro, which had been collecting the population, and providing the services, anyway.

Etymology 
Flat land is totally absent from the promontory, but around the top ridge the Venetians constructed a walled and turreted fort. In the centuries after the Venetians left much of the stone was re-used by the population. Sections of battlements and houses remain.

The fort was built before the age of cannon. It had been a defensible location in steep terrain and rough ground, with a view for some distance around. Whether or not the fort replaced an earlier one is unknown. By the time the Venetians abandoned it, the use of cannon had nullified most of its defensive value, as the bombardment of the Parthenon at Athens by Turkish ships had demonstrated. The Parthenon had been considered a secure location to store gunpowder. The Turks were not interested in occupying Kastri, and in general, fixed positions today are an easy target for persistent bombardment. They may hold out heroically for a time, but without supporting troops in the region are doomed to fall. Itanos to the north had been similarly abandoned centuries earlier.

The promontory is partly in the water. It is flanked by Kouremenos beach on the north and Chiona beach on the south. The Minoan settlement at Rousolakkos is located behind Chiona beach.

The center of Palaikastro is about  due west from there. To obtain such a name as "old fort," Palaikastro at the time must have been close to the promontory, in the Bronze Age, most likely at Rousolakkos. There is some evidence that the Minoans moved around the base, leaving remains even on the light slopes leading up to the promontory. 

It is incorrect to say, however, that anyone ever "inhabited" or "moved to" some sort of "hill" there. The promontory, though fortifiable to some extent, is no more habitable than the Rock of Gibraltar. Even if the population attempted to build housing up the cliffs, as is true of some Greek coastal towns, there would be a rockfall problem. There is no sign that this problem was ever addressed there. On the seaward side, the high cliffs with beating waves would have made use of the promontory as a port impossible. The promontory is not a hill, and no one ever settled on it or built up its treacherous slopes. No refugees could live for long in the citadel, due to lack of water, food, and space. It would have been easily isolated. It undoubtedly had value as a lookout and early warning station.

Administrative substructure
The local community of Palaikastro comprises several settlements (oikismoi).

Economy
The main economic activity of the approximately 1100 inhabitants continues to be agriculture. Olives and grape vines are cultivated and a few fishermen remain. Commercial fishing however is difficult these days because of the substantial overfishing in the Mediterranean Sea. Tourism is an important source of supplementary income and is likely to remain so.

Historical significance
It is a historic site. Already in Minoan times the region was a centre of trade. The port of Itanos, today several meters below sea level, is mentioned in ancient times. The very extensive Minoan commercial settlement Roussolakkos close to the Chiona beach, excavated by English archaeologists, clearly shows that the region was one of the most important commercial centres of the Minoan culture in the extreme east of the island of Crete.

Antiquities 
The Minoan Moulds of Palaikastro were discovered in October 1899 by a farmer 150 metres (160 yd) northeast of the town of Palaikastro. The Palaikastro Kouros is a carved figure of a youth that was recovered in fragments between 1987 and 1990.

Mount Petsofas above the town has the ruins of a Minoan peak sanctuary.

Gallery

Notes

References

External links

Palaikastro Archaeological Site
The Palaikastro kouros

Minoan sites in Crete
Populated places in Lasithi